The 1997 April Fool's Day blizzard was a  major winter storm in the Northeastern United States on March 31 and April 1, 1997.  The storm dumped rain, sleet, and snow from Maryland to Maine leaving hundreds of thousands without power and as much as three feet of snow on the ground.

Due to the date, many people took warnings of the storm less seriously. Plows had started to be put away for the summer and hardware stores still had to sell shovels again even though they already put out patio furniture. One commuter called it "Mother Nature's April Fools' Joke."

Evolution of the storm

Formation
The storm started as a surface low pressure system over the Ohio River Valley that was generated by an area of strong jet stream energy carving out an active upper air low pressure trough on Sunday March 30. The low pressure system brought rain to much of the Ohio Valley.

When the storm arrived in eastern New York and western New England, the areas received light rain. The storm moved off the coast of New Jersey on March 31 and began rapidly strengthening.  As the storm intensified, air began rising around the storm very rapidly, which cooled in the atmosphere and changed the rain into heavy snow. The low moved very slowly along the coast gaining strength throughout the day, and with a continuous supply of moisture, this allowed for an extended period of heavy snow.

Boston
Prior to the storm, Boston had received just  of snow for the season. A cold front passed early next day (Monday March 31), dropping the temperature into the 40s, and just before dawn light rain began to fall. In Boston the rain began to mix with wet snow mid-morning and eventually turned to wet snow and became heavier just after 7 p.m.

During the peak of the storm from about 11 p.m. March 31 to 3 a.m. Numerous lightning strikes and thunderclaps accompanied the extremely heavy snow, which accumulated  in those four hours. Moderate to heavy snow continued through midmorning before tapering off.

Impacts

New England

Precipitation received
The  of snow that fell at Boston's Logan International Airport was the fourth-biggest snowstorm in Boston history, behind the North American blizzard of 2003's , the Northeastern United States blizzard of 1978's , and the February 1969 nor'easter's . It also set a record for Boston's greatest April 24-hour snowfall. Parts of New England received  wind gusts at the height of the storm. Providence recorded  of snow which was the fourth greatest on record at the time. With  in Milford, Massachusetts, the state set a 24 hour snowfall record.

Damage and travel disruptions
A state of emergency was declared by Massachusetts Gov. William F. Weld. The snow came down too fast for road crews to keep up with and roads became impassable and thousands of cars were stranded. Commuter trolleys in Boston were closed for the first time in nearly twenty years, public transportation was crippled, about 1,000 motorists spent the night stranded in their cars and 4,000 stayed in shelters. Some of the narrow side streets of Boston were completely buried and portions of Interstate 95 and Route 128 were shut down because of the snow. The main roads and highways were cleared within a couple of days but the secondary roads remained a mess making travel difficult. Two days after the storm, subways and commuter rails were still sluggish because of fallen trees and signal problems.

The wet and heavy snow caused tree limbs and even whole trees to fall. Some fell on power lines, and many people were left without power. Electricity was knocked out for nearly 700,000 people. Nearly 13% of New England lost power, mainly due to trees falling on  power lines and utility poles. Power crews from as far away as Canada came to help clean up the area.

Logan Airport was also shut down from 2 p.m. March 31 to 10 p.m. April 1.

Mid-Atlantic
Upstate New York received   and in some parts of New Jersey two feet of snow fell causing delays on commuter trains. A disaster was declared in eight northeast counties by Pennsylvania Gov. Tom Ridge and the National Guard of the United States was dispatched to dig out cars. Interstate 84 had to be shut down because of a ten vehicle accident.

Injuries and deaths
Hospitals reported weather-related injuries including back sprains, pedestrians being hit by falling ice, and hand injuries including missing fingers from snow blowers. Three deaths were caused by the storm in Massachusetts and Rhode Island, all men who had heart attacks while shoveling, with another traffic death in New York which may have been caused by the weather.

References

April Fools' Day
1997-3
Nor'easters
1997 meteorology
1997 natural disasters in the United States
March 1997 events in the United States
April 1997 events in the United States